HTR-10 is a 10 MWt prototype high-temperature gas-cooled, pebble-bed reactor at Tsinghua University in China. Construction began in 1995, achieving its first criticality in December 2000, and was operated in full power condition in January 2003.

Two HTR-PM reactors, scaled up versions of the HTR-10 with 250-MWt capacity, were installed at the Shidao Bay Nuclear Power Plant near the city of Rongcheng in Shandong Province and achieved first criticality in september 2021.

Development 
HTR-10 is modeled after the German HTR-MODUL. Like the HTR-MODUL, HTR-10 is claimed to be fundamentally safer, potentially cheaper and more efficient than other nuclear reactor designs.

HTR-10 is a [pebble-bed high-temperature gas reactor utilizing spherical fuel elements with ceramic coated fuel particles. 
The reactor core has a diameter of 1.8 m, a mean height of 1.97 m and the volume of 5.0 m³, and is surrounded by graphite reflectors. 
The core is composed of 27,000 fuel elements. The fuel elements use low enriched uranium with a design mean burn up of 80,000 MWd/t. The pressure of the primary helium coolant circuit is 3.0 Mpa.

See also 

Pebble bed modular reactor
High-temperature engineering test reactor

References

External links
 Let a Thousand Reactors Bloom article at Wired News.
 April 2014: presentation given to the IAEA: HTR Progress in China

Nuclear power stations in China
Pebble bed reactors
Tsinghua University
2017 in China